Viperini is a taxonomic synonym that may refer to:

 Viperidae, the family of snakes known as vipers
 Viperinae, the subfamily of vipers known as true vipers